John Newcombe and Tony Roche were the defending champions, but lost in the quarterfinals to Clark Graebner and Charlie Pasarell.

Bob Lutz and Stan Smith won the title, defeating Arthur Ashe and Andrés Gimeno in the final, 11–9, 6–1, 7–5.

Seeds

  John Newcombe /  Tony Roche (quarterfinals)
  Ken Rosewall /  Fred Stolle (third round)
  Roy Emerson /  Rod Laver (second round)
  Mal Anderson /  Dennis Ralston (quarterfinals)

  Tom Okker /  Marty Riessen (quarterfinals)
  Bob Lutz /  Stan Smith (champions)
  Arthur Ashe /  Andrés Gimeno (final)
  Clark Graebner /  Charlie Pasarell (semifinals)

Draw

Finals

Top half

Section 1

Section 2

Bottom half

Section 3

Section 4

External links
 Men's Doubles main draw
1968 US Open – Men's draws and results at the International Tennis Federation

Men's Doubles
US Open (tennis) by year – Men's doubles